The 1956 United States Senate election in Kansas took place on November 6, 1956. Incumbent Republican Senator Frank Carlson won re-election to a second term.

Primary elections
Primary elections were held on August 7, 1956.

Democratic primary

Candidates
Paul L. Aylward, lawyer
George Hart, furrier, Democratic candidate for Lieutenant Governor of Kansas in 1954
Fred Kilian, farmer
Marlyn Korf, farmer

Withdrew
A. L. Oswald, lawyer

Results

Republican primary

Candidates
Frank Carlson, incumbent U.S. Senator
Walter I. Biddle, judge

Results

General election

Results

See also 
 1956 United States Senate elections

References

Bibliography
 

1956
Kansas
United States Senate